Dalit (from  meaning "broken/scattered"), also previously known as untouchable, is the lowest stratum of the castes in India. Dalits were excluded from the four-fold varna system of Hinduism and were seen as forming a fifth varna, also known by the name of Panchama. Dalits now profess various religious beliefs, including Hinduism, Buddhism, Sikhism, Christianity, and Islam. Scheduled Castes is the official term for Dalits as per the Constitution of India.

History 

The term Dalit is a self-applied concept for those called the "untouchables" and others that were outside of the traditional Hindu caste hierarchy. Economist and reformer B. R. Ambedkar (1891–1956) said that untouchability came into Indian society around 400 CE, due to the struggle for supremacy between Buddhism and Brahmanism (an ancient term for Brahmanical Hinduism). Some Hindu priests befriended untouchables and were demoted to low-caste ranks. Eknath, another excommunicated Brahmin, fought for the rights of untouchables during the Bhakti period.

In the late 1880s, the Marathi word 'Dalit' was used by Mahatma Jotiba Phule for the outcasts and Untouchables who were oppressed and broken in the Hindu society. Dalit is a vernacular form of the Sanskrit दलित (dalita). In Classical Sanskrit, this means "divided, split, broken, scattered". This word was repurposed in 19th-century Sanskrit to mean "(a person) not belonging to one of the four Varnas". It was perhaps first used in this sense by Pune-based social reformer Jyotirao Phule, in the context of the oppression faced by the erstwhile "untouchable" castes from other Hindus. The term dalits was in use as a translation for the British Raj census classification of Depressed Classes prior to 1935. It was popularised by Ambedkar, himself a Dalit, who included all depressed people irrespective of their caste into the definition of Dalits. It covered people who were excluded from the four-fold varna system of Hinduism and thought of themselves as forming a fifth varna, describing themselves as Panchama. In the 1970s its use was invigorated when it was adopted by the Dalit Panthers activist group.

Socio-legal scholar Oliver Mendelsohn and political economist Marika Vicziany wrote in 1998 that the term had become "intensely political ... While the use of the term might seem to express appropriate solidarity with the contemporary face of Untouchable politics, there remain major problems in adopting it as a generic term. Although the word is now quite widespread, it still has deep roots in a tradition of political radicalism inspired by the figure of B. R. Ambedkar." They went on to suggest that its use risked erroneously labelling the entire population of untouchables in India as being united by a radical politics. Anand Teltumbde also detects a trend towards denial of the politicised identity, for example among educated middle-class people who have converted to Buddhism and argue that, as Buddhists, they cannot be Dalits. This may be due to their improved circumstances giving rise to a desire not to be associated with the what they perceive to be the demeaning Dalit masses.

Other terms

Official term 
Scheduled Castes is the official term for Dalits in the opinion of India's National Commissions for Scheduled Castes (NCSC), who took legal advice that indicated modern legislation does not refer to Dalit and that therefore, it says, it is "unconstitutional" for official documents to do so. In 2004, the NCSC noted that some state governments used Dalits rather than Scheduled Castes in documentation and asked them to desist.

Some sources say that Dalit encompasses a broader range of communities than the official Scheduled Caste definition. It can include nomadic tribes and another official classification that also originated with the British Raj positive discrimination efforts in 1935, being the Scheduled Tribes. It is also sometimes used to refer to the entirety of India's oppressed peoples, which is the context that applies to its use in Nepalese society. An example of the limitations of the Scheduled Caste category is that, under Indian law, such people can only be followers of Buddhism, Hinduism or Sikhism, yet there are communities who claim to be Dalit Christians and Muslims, and the tribal communities often practise folk religions.

Harijan 
The term Harijan, or 'children of God', was coined by Narsinh Mehta, a Gujarati poet-saint of the Bhakti tradition, to refer to all devotees of Krishna irrespective of caste, class, or sex. Mahatma Gandhi, an admirer of Mehta's work, first used the word in the context of identifying Dalits in 1933. Ambedkar disliked the name as it placed Dalits in relation to a greater Hindu nation rather than as in an independent community like Muslims. In addition, many Dalits found, and still find, the term patronizing and derogatory, with some even claiming that the term really refers to children of devadasis. When untouchability was outlawed after Indian independence, the use of the word Harijan to describe ex-untouchables became more common among other castes than within Dalits themselves.

In 2017, Supreme Court of India noted calling people harijan was offensive.

Regional terms 
In Southern India, Dalits are sometimes known as Adi Dravida, Adi Karnataka, and Adi Andhra, which literally mean First Dravidians, Kannadigas, and Andhras, respectively. These terms were first used in 1917 by Southern Dalit leaders, who believed that they were the indigenous inhabitants of India. The terms are used in the states of Tamil Nadu, Karnataka, and Andhra Pradesh/Telangana, respectively, as a generic term for anyone from a Dalit caste.

In Maharashtra, according to historian and women's studies academic Shailaja Paik, Dalit is a term mostly used by members of the Mahar caste, into which Ambedkar was born. Most other communities prefer to use their own caste name.

In Nepal, aside from Harijan and, most commonly, Dalit, terms such as Haris (among Muslims), Achhoot, outcastes and neech jati are used.

Demographics 

Scheduled Caste communities exist across India and comprised 16.6% of the country's population,  2011 Census of India. Uttar Pradesh (21%), West Bengal (11%), Bihar (8%) and Tamil Nadu (7%) between them accounted for almost half the country's total Scheduled Caste population. They were most prevalent as a proportion of the states' population in Punjab, at about 32 per cent, while Mizoram had the lowest at approximately zero.

Similar groups are found throughout the rest of the Indian subcontinent; less than 2 per cent of Pakistan's population are Hindu and 70–75 per cent of those Hindus are Dalits, in Nepal, Bangladesh had 5 million Dalits in 2010 with the majority being landless and in chronic poverty, and Sri Lanka. They are also found as part of the Indian diaspora in many countries, including the United States, United Kingdom, Singapore, and the Caribbean.

India is home to over 200 million Dalits. According to Paul Diwakar, a Dalit activist from the National Campaign on Dalit Human Rights, "India has 600,000 villages and almost every village a small pocket on the outskirts is meant for Dalits."

Social status 

Dalits have had lowest social status in the traditional Hindu social structure but James Lochtefeld, a professor of religion and Asian studies, said in 2002 that the "adoption and popularization of [the term Dalit] reflects their growing awareness of the situation, and their greater assertiveness in demanding their legal and constitutional rights".

India's National Commission for Scheduled Castes considers official use of dalit as a label to be "unconstitutional" because modern legislation prefers Scheduled Castes; however, some sources say that Dalit has encompassed more communities than the official term of Scheduled Castes and is sometimes used to refer to all of India's oppressed peoples. A similar all-encompassing situation prevails in Nepal.

In 1932, the British Raj recommended separate electorates to select leaders for Dalits in the Communal Award. This was favoured by Ambedkar but when Mahatma Gandhi opposed the proposal it resulted in the Poona Pact. That in turn influenced the Government of India Act, 1935, which introduced the reservation of seats for the Depressed Classes, now renamed as Scheduled Castes.

From soon after its independence in 1947, India introduced a reservation system to enhance the ability of Dalits to have political representation and to obtain government jobs and education. In 1997, India elected its first Dalit President, K. R. Narayanan. Many social organisations have promoted better conditions for Dalits through education, healthcare and employment. Nonetheless, while caste-based discrimination was prohibited and untouchability abolished by the Constitution of India, such practices are still widespread. To prevent harassment, assault, discrimination and similar acts against these groups, the Government of India enacted the Prevention of Atrocities Act, also called the SC/ST Act, on 31 March 1995. In accordance with the order of the Bombay High Court, the Information and Broadcasting Ministry (I&B Ministry) of the Government of India issued an advisory to all media channels in September 2018, asking them to use "Scheduled Castes" instead of the word "Dalit".

George Kunnath claims that there "is and has been an internal hierarchy between the various Dalit castes". According to Kunnath, the Dusadhs are considered the highest while the Musahars are considered the lowest within the Dalit groups.

Occupations 
In the past, they were believed to be so impure that upper caste Hindus considered their presence to be polluting. The "impure status" was related to their historic hereditary occupations that caste Hindus considered to be "polluting" or debased, such as working with leather, disposing of dead animals, manual scavenging, or sanitation work.

Forced by the circumstance of their birth and poverty, Dalits in India continue to work as sanitation workers: manual scavengers, cleaners of drains, garbage collectors, and sweepers of roads. As of 2019, an estimated 40 to 60 per cent of the 6 million Dalit households are engaged in sanitation work. The most common Dalit caste performing sanitation work is Valmiki (also Balmiki) caste.

History 

Gopal Baba Walangkar (c. 1840–1900) is generally considered to be the pioneer of the Dalit movement, seeking a society in which they were not discriminated against. Another pioneer was Harichand Thakur (c. 1812–1878) with his Matua organisation that involved the Namasudra (Chandala) community in the Bengal Presidency. Ambedkar himself believed Walangkar to be the progenitor. Another early social reformer who worked to improve conditions for Dalits was Jyotirao Phule (1827–1890).

The 1950 Constitution of India, introduced after the country gained independence, included measures to improve the socioeconomic conditions of Dalits. Aside from banning untouchability, these included the reservation system, a means of positive discrimination that created the classifications of Scheduled Castes, Scheduled Tribes for Dalits. Communities that were categorised as being one of those groups were guaranteed a percentage of the seats in the national and state legislatures, as well as in government jobs and places of education. The system has its origins in the 1932 Poona Pact between Ambedkar and Gandhi, when Ambedkar conceded his demand that the Dalits should have an electorate separate from the caste Hindus in return for Gandhi accepting measures along these lines. The notion of a separate electorate had been proposed in the Communal Award made by the British Raj authorities, and the outcome of the Pact – the Government of India Act of 1935 – both introduced the new term of Scheduled Castes in replacement for Depressed Classes and reserved seats for them in the legislatures.

By 1995, of all federal government jobs in India – 10.1 per cent of Class I, 12.7 per cent of Class II, 16.2 per cent of Class III, and 27.2 per cent of Class IV jobs were held by Dalits. Of the most senior jobs in government agencies and government-controlled enterprises, only 1 per cent were held by Dalits, not much change in 40 years. In the 21st century, Dalits have been elected to India's highest judicial and political offices.

In 2001, the quality of life of the Dalit population in India was worse than that of the overall Indian population on metrics such as access to health care, life expectancy, education attainability, access to drinking water and housing.

Economic status 

According to a 2014 report to the Ministry of Minority Affairs, over 44.8 per cent of Scheduled Tribe (ST) and 33.8 per cent of Scheduled Caste (SC) populations in rural India were living below the poverty line in 2011–12. In urban areas, 27.3 per cent of ST and 21.8 per cent of SC populations were below the poverty line.

Some Dalits have achieved affluence, although most remain poor. Some Dalit intellectuals, such as Chandra Bhan Prasad, have argued that the living standards of many Dalits have improved since the economic system became more liberalised starting in 1991 and have supported their claims through large surveys. According to the Socio Economic and Caste Census 2011, nearly 79 per cent of Adivasi households and 73 per cent of Dalit households were the most deprived among rural households in India. While 45 per cent of SC households are landless and earn a living by manual casual labour, the figure is 30 per cent for Adivasis.

A 2012 survey by Mangalore University in Karnataka found that 93 per cent of Dalit families in the state of Karnataka live below the poverty line.

Discrimination 
Discrimination against Dalits has been observed across South Asia and among the South Asian diaspora. According to a 2007 report by Human Rights Watch (HRW), the treatment of Dalits has been like a "hidden apartheid" and that they "endure segregation in housing, schools, and access to public services". HRW noted that Manmohan Singh, then Prime Minister of India, saw a parallel between the apartheid system and untouchability. Eleanor Zelliot also notes Singh's 2006 comment but says that, despite the obvious similarities, race prejudice and the situation of Dalits "have a different basis and perhaps a different solution". Though the Indian Constitution abolished untouchability, the oppressed status of Dalits remains a reality. In rural India, stated Klaus Klostermaier in 2010, "they still live in secluded quarters, do the dirtiest work, and are not allowed to use the village well and other common facilities". In the same year, Zelliot noted that "In spite of much progress over the last sixty years, Dalits are still at the social and economic bottom of society."

The South Asia State of Minorities Report 2020 has found that since the BJP (the Indian people's party) has returned to political power in India as of May 2018, "Hate crimes against minorities have seen a spike – taking the form of mob lynching and vigilante violence against Muslims, Christians, and Dalits. BJP also strengthened and expanded a series of discriminatory laws and measures that target religious minorities. These include anti-conversion laws, blamed by human rights groups for empowering Hindutva groups to conduct campaigns of harassment, social exclusion and violence against Christians, Muslims, and other religious minorities across the country’. Laws ostensibly meant for the protection of cows continue to provide institutional backing for similar campaigns against Muslims and Dalits."

While discrimination against Dalits has declined in urban areas and in the public sphere, it still exists in rural areas and in the private sphere, in everyday matters such as access to eating places, schools, temples and water sources. Some Dalits successfully integrated into urban Indian society, where caste origins are less obvious. In rural India, however, caste origins are more readily apparent and Dalits often remain excluded from local religious life, though some qualitative evidence suggests that exclusion is diminishing.

According to the 2014 NCAER/University of Maryland survey, 27 per cent of the Indian population still practices untouchability; the figure may be higher because many people refuse to acknowledge doing so when questioned, although the methodology of the survey was also criticised for potentially inflating the figure. Across India, Untouchability was practised among 52 per cent of Brahmins, 33 per cent of Other Backward Classes and 24 per cent of non-Brahmin forward castes. Untouchability was also practised by people of minority religions – 23 per cent of Sikhs, 18 per cent of Muslims and 5 per cent of Christians. According to statewide data, Untouchability is most commonly practised in Madhya Pradesh (53 per cent), followed by Himachal Pradesh (50 per cent), Chhattisgarh (48 per cent), Rajasthan and Bihar (47 per cent), Uttar Pradesh (43 per cent), and Uttarakhand (40 per cent).

Examples of segregation have included the Madhya Pradesh village of Ghatwani, where the Scheduled Tribe population of Bhilala do not allow Dalit villagers to use the public borewell for fetching water and thus they are forced to drink dirty water. In metropolitan areas around New Delhi and Bangalore, Dalits and Muslims face discrimination from upper caste landlords when seeking places to rent.

In 1855, Mutka Salve, a 14-year-old student of Dalit leader Savitribai Phule, wrote that during the rule of Baji Rao of the Maratha Empire, the Dalit castes were chased away from their lands to build large buildings. They were also forced to drink oil mixed with red lead causing them to die, and then they were buried in the foundations of buildings, thus wiping out generations of Dalits. Under the rule of Baji Rao, if a Dalit crossed in front of a gym, they would cut off his head and play "bat and ball" on the ground, with their swords as bats and his head as a ball. Under these 17th century kings, human sacrifice of untouchable persons was not unusual. They also created intricate rules and operations to ensure that they stayed untouchables. She also wrote that if a Dalit learned to read and write, Baji Rao would say that their education takes away a Brahmin's job, and they were punished.

Education 
According to an analysis by The IndiaGoverns Research Institute, Dalits constituted nearly half of primary school drop-outs in Karnataka during the period 2012–14. A sample survey in 2014, conducted by Dalit Adhikar Abhiyan and funded by ActionAid, found that among state schools in Madhya Pradesh, 88 per cent discriminated against Dalit children. In 79 per cent of the schools studied, Dalit children are forbidden from touching mid-day meals. They are required to sit separately at lunch in 35 per cent of schools, and are required to eat with specially marked plates in 28 per cent.

There have been incidents and allegations of SC and ST teachers and professors being discriminated against and harassed by authorities, upper castes colleagues and upper caste students in different education institutes of India. In some cases, such as in Gujarat, state governments have argued that, far from being discriminatory, their rejection when applying for jobs in education has been because there are no suitably qualified candidates from those classifications.

Healthcare and nutrition 
Discrimination can also exist in access to healthcare and nutrition. A sample survey of Dalits, conducted over several months in Madhya Pradesh and funded by ActionAid in 2014, found that health field workers did not visit 65 per cent of Dalit settlements. 47 per cent of Dalits were not allowed entry into ration shops; and 64 per cent were given less grains than non-Dalits. In Haryana state, 49 per cent of Dalit children under five years were underweight and malnourished while 80 per cent of those in the 6–59 months age group were anaemic in 2015.

Crime 
Dalits comprise a slightly disproportionate number of India's prison inmates. While Dalits (including both SCs and STs) constitute 25 per cent of the Indian population, they account for 33.2 per cent of prisoners. About 24.5 per cent of death row inmates in India are from Scheduled Castes and Scheduled Tribes which is proportionate to their population. The percentage is highest in Maharashtra (50 per cent), Karnataka (36.4 per cent) and Madhya Pradesh (36 per cent). Dalits have been arrested on false pretexts. According to Human Rights Watch, politically motivated arrests of Dalit rights activists occur and those arrested can be detained for six months without charge.

Caste-related violence between Dalit and non-Dalits stems from ongoing prejudice by upper caste members. The Bhagana rape case, which arose out of a dispute of allocation of land, is an example of atrocities against Dalit girls and women. In August 2015, due to continued alleged discrimination from upper castes of the village, about 100 Dalit inhabitants converted to Islam in a ceremony at Jantar Mantar, New Delhi. Inter-caste marriage has been proposed as a remedy, but according to a 2014 survey of 42,000 households by the New Delhi-based National Council of Applied Economic Research (NCAER) and the University of Maryland, it was estimated that only 5 per cent of Indian marriages cross caste boundaries.

According to data for 2000 collected by India's National Crime Records Bureau, 25,455 crimes against Dalits were committed in the year 2000, the latest year for which the data is only available, 2 Dalits are assaulted every hour, 3 Dalit women are raped every day, 2 Dalits are murdered; and 2 Dalit homes are set on fire every day. Amnesty International documented a high number of sexual assaults against Dalit women, which were often committed by landlords, upper-caste villagers, and policemen, according to a study published in 2001. According to the research, only about 5% of assaults are recorded, and policemen dismiss at least 30% of rape reports as false. The study also discovered that cops often seek bribes, threaten witnesses, and conceal evidence. Victims of rape have also been killed. There have been reports of Dalits being forced to eat human faeces and drink urine by upper caste members and the police. In September 2015, a 45-year-old dalit woman was allegedly stripped naked and was forced to drink urine by perpetrators in Madhya Pradesh. In some parts of India, there have been allegations that Dalit grooms riding horses for wedding ceremonies have been beaten up and ostracised by upper caste people. In August 2015, upper caste people burned houses and vehicles belonging to Dalit families and slaughtered their livestock in reaction to Dalits daring to hold a temple car procession at a village in Tamil Nadu. In August 2015, it was claimed that a Jat Khap Panchayat ordered the rape of two Dalit sisters because their brother eloped with a married Jat girl of the same village. In 2003, the higher caste Muslims in Bihar opposed the burials of lower caste Muslims in the same graveyard. A Dalit activist was killed in 2020 for social media posts criticising Brahmins. A dalit was killed in 2019 for eating in front of upper-caste men.

Prevention of Atrocities Act 

The Government of India has attempted on several occasions to legislate specifically to address the issue of caste-related violence that affects SCs and STs. Aside from the Constitutional abolition of untouchability, there has been the Untouchability (Offences) Act of 1955, which was amended in the same year to become the Protection of Civil Rights Act. It was determined that neither of those Acts were effective, so the Scheduled Caste and Scheduled Tribe (Prevention of Atrocities) Act of 1989 (POA) came into force.

The POA designated specific crimes against SCs and STs as "atrocities" – a criminal act that has "the quality of being shockingly cruel and inhumane" – which should be prosecuted under its terms rather than existing criminal law. It created corresponding punishments. Its purpose was to curb and punish violence against Dalits, including humiliations such as the forced consumption of noxious substances. Other atrocities included forced labour, denial of access to water and other public amenities, and sexual abuse. The Act permitted Special Courts exclusively to try POA cases. The Act called on states with high levels of caste violence (said to be "atrocity-prone") to appoint qualified officers to monitor and maintain law and order.

In 2015, the Parliament of India passed the Scheduled Castes and Scheduled Tribes (Prevention of Atrocities) Amendment Act to address issues regarding implementation of the POA, including instances where the police put procedural obstacles in the way of alleged victims or indeed outright colluded with the accused. It also extended the number of acts that were deemed to be atrocities. One of those remedies, in an attempt to address the slow process of cases, was to make it mandatory for states to set up the exclusive Special Courts that the POA had delineated. Progress in doing so, however, was reported in April 2017 to be unimpressive. P. L. Punia, a former chairman of the NCSC, said that the number of pending cases was high because most of the extant Special Courts were in fact not exclusive but rather being used to process some non-POA cases, and because "The special prosecutors are not bothered and the cases filed under this Act are as neglected as the victims". While Dalit rights organisations were cautiously optimistic that the amended Act would improve the situation, legal experts were pessimistic.

Religion 

Discrimination is illegal under Indian law by the Removal of Civil Disabilities Act (Act 21 of 1938), the Temple Entry Authorization and Indemnity Act 1939 (Act XXII of 1939) and Article 17 of the Constitution which outlawed Untouchability. After India's independence in 1947, secular nationalism based on a "composite culture" made all people equal citizens, but Hindutva forces have worked to change India's secular tradition and promote Hindu nationalism. In Pakistan there are tensions between forces that want a modern secular state or an Islamic one. The constitution of Bangladesh proclaims Islam is the state religion but upholds secularism.

Hinduism 

Most Dalits in India are Hindu. There have been incidents which showed that Dalits were restricted from entering temples by high-caste Hindus, and participation in religious processions.

In the 19th century, the Brahmo Samaj, Arya Samaj and the Ramakrishna Mission actively participated in the rights of Dalits. While Dalits had places to worship, the first upper-caste temple to openly welcome Dalits was the Laxminarayan Temple in Wardha in 1928. It was followed by the Temple Entry Proclamation issued by the last King of Travancore in the Indian state of Kerala in 1936.

In the 1930s, Gandhi and Ambedkar disagreed regarding retention of the caste system. Whilst Ambedkar wanted to see it destroyed, Gandhi thought that it could be modified by reinterpreting Hindu texts so that the untouchables were absorbed into the Shudra varna. It was this disagreement that led to the Poona Pact. Gandhi began the Harijan Yatra to help the Dalits, but ran into some opposition from Dalits that wanted a complete break from Hinduism.

The declaration by princely states of Kerala between 1936 and 1947 that temples were open to all Hindus went a long way towards ending untouchability there. However, educational opportunities to Dalits in Kerala remain limited.

Other Hindu groups attempted to reconcile with the Dalit community. Hindu temples are increasingly receptive to Dalit priests, a function formerly reserved for Brahmins. Brahmins such as Subramania Bharati passed Brahminhood onto a Dalit, while in Shivaji's Maratha Empire Dalit warriors (the Mahar Regiment) joined his forces.

The fight for temple entry rights for Dalits continues to cause controversy. In a 2015 incident in Meerut, when a Dalit belonging to Valmiki caste was denied entry to a Hindu temple he converted to Islam. In September 2015, four Dalit women were fined by the upper-caste Hindus for entering a temple in Karnataka.

There have been allegations that Dalits in Nepal are denied entry to Hindu temples. In at least one reported case, they were beaten up by some upper-caste people for doing so.

Buddhism 
In 1956, the Dalit jurist Bhimrao Ramji Ambedkar (1891–1956) launched the Dalit Buddhist movement, leading several mass conversions of Dalits from Hinduism to Buddhism. Ambedkar's Buddhism is a new kind of Buddhism that focuses on social and political engagement. About half a million Dalits joined Ambedkar in rejecting Hinduism and challenging its caste system. The movement is centered in Maharashtra, and according to the 2011 census, there were 6.5 million Marathi Buddhists (mainly Dalit Buddhists) in Maharashtra.

Another Dalit Buddhist leader and reformer was Pandit Iyothee Thass, founder of the Sakya Buddhist Society of Tamil Nadu.

Sikhism 

Guru Nanak in Guru Granth Sahib calls for everyone to treat each other equally. Subsequent Sikh Gurus, all of whom came from the Khatri caste, also denounced the hierarchy of the caste system. Despite this, social stratification exists in the Sikh community. The bulk of the Sikhs of Punjab belong to the Jat caste; there are also two Dalit Sikh castes in the state, called the Mazhabis and the Ramdasias.

Sunrinder S. Jodhka says that, in practice, Sikhs belonging to the landowning dominant castes have not shed all their prejudices against the dalit castes. While dalits would be allowed entry into the village gurudwaras they would not be permitted to cook or serve langar (the communal meal). Therefore, wherever they could mobilise resources, the Sikh dalits of Punjab have tried to construct their own gurudwara and other local-level institutions in order to attain a certain degree of cultural autonomy. In 1953, Sikh leader Master Tara Singh succeeded in winning the demands from the government to include Sikh castes of the converted untouchables in the list of scheduled castes. In the Shiromani Gurdwara Prabandhak Committee (SGPC), 20 of the 140 seats are reserved for low-caste Sikhs.

Sikh women are required to have the surname "Kaur", and men, the surname "Singh", in order to eradicate caste identities and discrimination.

In 2003 the Talhan village Gurudwara endured a bitter dispute between Jat Sikhs and Chamars. The Chamars came out in force and confronted the Randhawa and Bains Jat Sikh landlords, who refused to give the Chamars a share on the governing committee of a shrine dedicated to Shaheed Baba Nihal Singh. The shrine earned 3–7 crore Indian Rupees, and the Jat Sikh landlords allegedly "gobbled up a substantial portion of the offerings". Though Dalits form more than 60 per cent of Talhan's 5,000-strong population, local traditions ensured that they were denied a place on the committee. The landlords, in league with radical Sikh organisations and the SGPC, attempted to keep out the Dalits by razing the shrine overnight and constructing a gurdwara on it, but the Dalit quest for a say in the governing committee did not end.

Chamars fought a four-year court battle with the landlords and their allies, including the Punjab Police. In that time Jats conducted several boycotts against the Chamars. The Jat Sikhs and their allies cut off the power supply to their homes. In addition, various scuffles and fights set Chamar youths armed with lathis, rocks, bricks, soda bottles and anything they could find fought Jat Sikh landlords, youths and the Punjab police. Dalit youngsters painted their homes and motorcycles with the slogan, Putt Chamar De (proud sons of Chamars) in retaliation to the Jat slogan, Putt Jattan De.

Jainism 
Historically Jainism was practised by many communities across India. They are often conservative and are generally considered upper-caste.

In 1958, a Sthanakvasi Jain called Muni Sameer Muni came into contact with members of the Khatik community in the Udaipur region, who decided to adopt Jainism. Their centre, Ahimsa Nagar, located about four miles from Chittorgarh, was inaugurated by Mohanlal Sukhadia in 1966. Sameer Muni termed them Veerwaal, that is, belonging to Mahavira. A 22-year-old youth, Chandaram Meghwal, was initiated as a Jain monk at Ahore town in Jalore district in 2005. In 2010 a Mahar engineer called Vishal Damodar was initiated as a Jain monk by Acharya Navaratna Sagar Suriji at Samet Shikhar. Acharya Nanesh, the eighth Achayra of Sadhumargi Jain Shravak Sangha, had preached among the Balai community in 1963 near Ratlam. His followers are called Dharmapal. In 1984, some of the Bhangis of Jodhpur came under the influence of Acharya Shri Tulsi and adopted Jainism.

Christianity 

Christian Dalits are found in India, Pakistan, Bangladesh, and Nepal.

Mass conversions of lower caste Hindus to Christianity and Islam took place in order to escape the discrimination. The main Dalit groups that participated in these conversions were the Chuhras of Punjab, Chamars of North India (Uttar Pradesh, Bihar and Madhya Pradesh), Vankars of Gujarat, and Pulayas of Kerala.
The first people converted to Christianity by Jesuits of the Madura Mission were members of Nadars, Maravars, and Pallar.
They believed that "Christianity is a true religion; a desire for protection from oppressors and, if possible, material aid; the desire for education for their children; and the knowledge that those who have become Christians had improved".

Christianity was thought to be egalitarian and could provide mobility away from the caste. Sometimes the only change seen was their personal religious identity. Even after conversion, in some cases Dalits were discriminated against due to the "residual leftover" practice of caste discrimination from their previous traditions. This is attributed to the predominantly Hindu society they lived in. Discrimination against Dalit Christians also remained in interactions and mannerisms between castes; for example, during the earlier days, the 'lower caste Christians' had to [cover] their mouths when talking to a Syrian Christian.
In many cases they were still referred to by their Hindu caste names: For example Pulayans in Kerala, Pariah in Tamil Nadu, and Madigas in Andra Pradesh, by members of all religious backgrounds.

Even after conversion, to some extent segregation, restriction, hierarchy, and graded ritual purity remained. Data shows that there is more discrimination and less class mobility among the people living in the rural areas, where incidents of caste discrimination is higher among people from all religious backgrounds.
In many cases, the churches referred to the Dalits as 'New Christians'. It is alleged to be a derogatory term which classifies the Dalit Christians to be looked down upon by other Christians. During the earlier days of Christianity, in some churches in south India the Dalits had either separate seating, or had to attend the mass outside. Dalit Christians are also said to be grossly underrepresented amongst the clergy in some places.

Caste-based occupations held by Dalits also show a clear segregation which perpetuated even after becoming Christian. Occupational patterns (including manual scavenging) are prevalent among Dalit Christians in north-west India are said to be quite similar to that of Dalit Hindus. Occupational discrimination for Dalit Christians goes so far as to restrict not only employment but in some cases for clean sanitation and water.

Islam 

Most of India's 140 million Muslims are descended from local converts. Many of them converted to Islam to escape Hindu upper-caste oppression. 75% of the present Indian Muslim population as Dalits.

Political involvement 

Dalit-led political parties include:

National dalit-led political parties in India 

 Bahujan Samaj Party, is national political party as per Election Commission of India
 Azad Samaj Party

Other recognized state political parties 
 Azad Samaj Party
Vanchit Bahujan Aaghadi, led by Prakash Yashwant Ambedkar, Ambedkar's grandson
Republican Party of India factions, active in Maharashtra
 Viduthalai Chiruthaigal Katchi and Puthiya Tamilagam are the two major dalit parties in Tamil Nadu
 Lok Janshakti Party, Bihar

Nepali Dalit-led parties 
 Bahujan Shakti Party, Nepal
 Dalit Janajati Party, Nepal

Dalit-led political parties in Pakistan 
 Dalit Sujag Tehreek, Pakistan

Other dalit groups 

Anti-Dalit prejudices exist in groups such as the extremist militia Ranvir Sena, largely run by upper-caste landlords in Bihar. They oppose equal treatment of Dalits and have resorted to violence. The Ranvir Sena is considered a terrorist organisation by the government of India. In 2015, Cobrapost exposed many leaders especially like C. P. Thakur alongside former PM Chandra Shekhar associated with Ranvir Sena in Bihar Dalit massacres while governments of Nitish Kumar (under pressure from BJP), Lalu Prasad Yadav and Rabri Devi did nothing to get justice for Dalits.

The rise of Hindutva's (Hindu nationalism) role in Indian politics has accompanied allegations that religious conversions of Dalits are due to allurements like education and jobs rather than faith. Critics argue that laws banning conversion and limiting social relief for converts mean that conversion impedes economic success. However, Bangaru Laxman, a Dalit politician, was a prominent member of the Hindutva movement.

Another political issue is Dalit affirmative-action quotas in government jobs and university admissions. About 8 per cent of the seats in the National and State Parliaments are reserved for Scheduled Caste and Tribe candidates.

Jagjivan Ram (1908–1986) was the first scheduled caste leader to emerge at the national level from Bihar. He was member of the Constituent assembly that drafted India's constitution. Ram also served in the interim national government of 1946 He served in the cabinets of Congress party Prime ministers Jawaharlal Nehru, Lal Bahadur Shastri and Indira Gandhi. His last position in government was as Deputy Prime Minister of India in the Janata Party government of 1977–1979,

In modern times several Bharatiya Janata Party leaders were Dalits, including Dinanath Bhaskar, Ramchandra Veerappa and Suraj Bhan.

In India's most populous state, Uttar Pradesh, Dalits have had a major political impact. The Dalit-led Bahujan Samaj Party (BSP) had previously run the government and that party's leader, Mayawati, served several times as chief minister. Regarding her election in 2007, some reports claimed her victory was due to her ability to win support from both 17 per cent of Muslims and nearly 17 per cent Brahmins alongside 80 per cent of Dalits. However, surveys of voters on the eve of elections, indicated that caste loyalties were not the voters' principal concern. Instead, inflation and other issues of social and economic development dictated the outcome. Mayawati's success in reaching across castes has led to speculation about her as a potential future Prime Minister of India.

Aside from Mayawati in Uttar Pradesh, Damodaram Sanjivayya was chief minister of Andhra Pradesh from 11 January 1960 to 12 March 1962, and Jitan Ram Manjhi was chief minister of Bihar for just under a year. In 1997, K. R. Narayanan, who was a Dalit, was elected as President of India. In 2017, Ramnath Kovind was elected as the President of India, becoming the second dalit president of the country.

Votebank 

Votebank politics are common in India, usually based on religion or caste. Indeed, the term itself was coined by the Indian sociologist M. N. Srinivas. Dalits are often used as a votebank. There have been instances where it has been alleged that an election-winning party reneged on promises made to the Dalits made during the election campaign or have excluded them from party affairs.

Scheduled Castes and Scheduled Tribes Sub-Plan 
The SC, ST Sub-Plan, or Indiramma Kalalu, is a budget allocation by the Government of Andhra Pradesh for the welfare of Dalits. The law was enacted in May 2013. SCs and STs have separate panels for spending. The plan was meant to prevent the government from diverting funds meant for SCs and STs to other programs, which was historically the case. , no equivalent national plan existed. Scheduled Castes Sub Plan and Tribal Sub-Plan funds are often diverted by state governments to other purposes.

While the Indian Constitution has provisions for the social and economic uplift of Dalits to support their upward social mobility, these concessions are limited to Hindus. Dalits who have converted to other religions have asked that benefits be extended to them.

Beyond the Indian subcontinent

United Kingdom 
After World War II, immigration from the former British Empire was largely driven by labour shortages. Like the rest of the Indian subcontinent diaspora, Dalits immigrated and established their own communities.

A 2009 report alleged that caste discrimination is "rife" in the United Kingdom. The report alleged that casteism persists in the workplace and within the National Health Service and at doctor's offices.

Some claim that caste discrimination is non-existent. Some have rejected the government's right to interfere in the community. The Hindu Forum of Britain conducted their own research, concluding that caste discrimination was "not endemic in British society", that reports to the contrary aimed to increase discrimination by legislating expression and behaviour and that barriers should instead be removed through education.

A 2010 study found that caste discrimination occurs in Britain at work and in service provision. While not ruling out the possibility of discrimination in education, no such incidents were uncovered. The report found favourable results from educational activities. However, non-legislative approaches were claimed to be less effective in the workplace and would not help when the authorities were discriminating. One criticism of discrimination law was the difficulty in obtaining proof of violations. Perceived benefits of legislation were that it provides redress, leads to greater understanding and reduces the social acceptance of such discrimination.

More recent studies in Britain were inconclusive and found that discrimination was "not religion specific and is subscribed to by members of any or no religion". Equalities Minister Helen Grant found insufficient evidence to justify specific legislation, while Shadow Equalities minister Kate Green said that the impact is on a relatively small number of people. Religious studies professor Gavin Flood of the Oxford Centre for Hindu Studies concluded that the Hindu community in Britain is particularly well integrated, loosening caste ties. Casteist beliefs were prevalent mainly among first generation immigrants, with such prejudices declining with each successive generation due to greater assimilation.

From September 2013 to February 2014, Indian philosopher Meena Dhanda led a project on 'Caste in Britain' for the UK Equality and Human Rights Commission (EHRC), which focused on the proposed inclusion of a provision in the Equality Act 2010 to protect British citizens against caste discrimination. In 2018 the UK government decided not to include caste as a "protected characteristic" within the terms of the Act, and to rely instead on case law to identify tests for caste-based discrimination.

Supporters of anti-caste legislation include Lord Avebury and Lady Thornton.

Sikh diaspora in Britain 

Sikhs in the United Kingdom are affected by caste. Gurdwaras such as those of the Ramgarhia Sikhs are organised along caste lines and most are controlled by a single caste. In most British towns and cities with a significant Sikh population, rival gurdwaras can be found with caste-specific management committees. The caste system and caste identity is entrenched and reinforced.

Caste-based discrimination has occurred amongst Sikhs in the UK. At a sports competition in Birmingham in 1999, Jat Sikhs refused to eat food that had been cooked and prepared by the Chamar community.

The few gurdwaras that accept inter-caste marriages do so reluctantly. Gurdwaras may insist on the presence of Singh and Kaur in the names of the bridegroom and bride, or deny them access to gurdwara-based religious services and community centres.

In the Caribbean 
It is estimated that in 1883, about one-third of the immigrants who arrived in the Caribbean were Dalits. The shared experience of being exploited in a foreign land gradually broke down caste barriers in the Caribbean Hindu communities.

In Continental Europe 
The Romani people, originating in northern India, are said to be of Dalit ancestry. Between 1001 and 1026, the Romani fought under their Hindu rulers to fight the Ghaznavids.

In the United States 
Many Dalits first came to the United States to flee caste-based oppression in South Asia. After the Chinese Exclusion Act of 1882, the demand for labourers brought in many caste-diverse South Asian immigrants, many of whom were Dalit. After the 1965 Immigration and Naturalization Act, immigrants from India were primarily professionals and students, largely from upper caste or dominant caste families. However, from the 1990s onwards, many more of the skilled labourers arriving from India have been Dalit, due to multiple generations of affirmative action policies in India, as well as ongoing efforts of organised resistance against caste discrimination.

Dalits have faced discrimination and mistreatment throughout their existence in the United States. In the landmark Supreme Court Case United States v. Bhagat Singh Thind, Thind unsuccessfully argued for his right to citizenship by claiming that his lighter complexion and upper-caste background implied that he was in fact Caucasian. Thind's lawyers described his supposed superiority to lower-caste Indians, stating "The high-caste Hindu regards the aboriginal Indian Mongoloid in the same manner as the American regards the Negro, speaking from a matrimonial standpoint." This attitude describes the disapproval of low-caste Indians such as Dalits held by upper caste Indian Americans at the time.

Some people, like S.P. Kothari, argue that there is no caste division within Hindus in the United States today. However, reports and stories have shown Dalit Americans continue to face significant discrimination in the United States. In 2018, Equality Labs released a report on "Caste in the United States". This report found that one in two Dalit Americans live in fear of their caste being "outed". In addition, 60% have experienced caste-based discriminatory jokes, and 25% have suffered verbal or physical assault because of their caste.

The Equality Labs report also found that two-thirds of Dalit Americans experienced unfair treatment at their workplace. In late June 2020, the California Department of Fair Employment and Housing filed a lawsuit against Cisco Systems, alleging that a Dalit engineer at the company faced discrimination from two of his upper-caste supervisors for his Dalit background. The lawsuit claims that "higher caste supervisors and co-workers imported the discriminatory system's practices into their team and Cisco's workplace". At the BAPS Hindu temple in the city of Robbinsville, New Jersey, some 200 workers to the U.S. on R-1 visas as religious volunteers filed suit over being held against their will.

Literature 

Dalit literature forms a distinct part of Indian literature. One of the first Dalit writers was Madara Chennaiah, an 11th-century cobbler-saint who lived in the reign of Western Chalukyas and who is regarded by some scholars as the "father of Vachana poetry". Another early Dalit poet is Dohara Kakkaiah, a Dalit by birth, six of whose confessional poems survive. The Bharatiya Dalit Sahitya Akademi (Indian Dalit Literature Academy) was founded in 1984 by Babu Jagjivan Ram.

Notable modern authors include Mahatma Phule and Ambedkar in Maharashtra, who focused on the issues of Dalits through their works and writings. This started a new trend in Dalit writing and inspired many Dalits to offer work in Marathi, Hindi, Tamil and Punjabi. There are novels, poems and even drama on Dalit issues. The Indian author Rajesh Talwar has written a play titled 'Gandhi, Ambedkar, and the Four Legged Scorpion' in which the personal experiences of Dr Ambedkar and the sufferings of the community have been highlighted.

Baburao Bagul, Bandhu Madhav and Shankar Rao Kharat, worked in the 1960s. Later the little magazine movement became popular. In Sri Lanka, writers such as K.Daniel and Dominic Jeeva gained mainstream popularity.

In the film industry 

Until the 1980s, Dalits had little involvement in Bollywood or other film industries of India and the community were rarely depicted at the heart of storylines. Chirag Paswan (son of Dalit leader Ram Vilas Paswan) launched his career in Bollywood with his debut film Miley Naa Miley Hum in 2011. Despite political connections and the financial ability to struggle against ingrained prejudices, Chirag was not able to "bag" any other movie project in the following years. Chirag, in his early days, described Bollywood as his "childhood dream", but eventually entered politics instead. When the media tried to talk to him about "Caste in Bollywood", he refused to talk about the matter. A recent Hindi film to portray a Dalit character in the leading role, although it was not acted by a Dalit, was Eklavya: The Royal Guard (2007). The continued use of caste based references to Dalit sub-castes in South Indian films (typecast and pigeonholed in their main socio-economic sub-group) angers many Dalit fans.

A Brazilian telenovela India: A Love Story was broadcast in 2009 where the main female character Maya, who is of upper class, falls in love with a Dalit person.

Internal conflicts 

Several Dalit groups are rivals and sometimes communal tensions are evident. A study found more than 900 Dalit sub-castes throughout India, with internal divisions. Emphasising any one caste threatens what is claimed to be an emerging Dalit identity and fostering rivalry among SCs.

A DLM (Dalit Liberation Movement) party leader said in the early 2000s that it is easier to organise Dalits on a caste basis than to fight caste prejudice itself.

Balmikis and Pasis in the 1990s refused to support the BSP, claiming it was a Jatav party but over 80 per cent of dalits from all united Dalit castes voted BSP to power in 2007.

Many converted Dalit Sikhs claim a superior status over the Hindu Raigars, Joatia Chamars and Ravidasis and sometimes refuse to intermarry with them. They are divided into gotras that regulate their marriage alliances. In Andhra Pradesh, Mala and Madiga were constantly in conflict with each other but as of 2015 Mala and Madiga students work for common dalit cause at University level.

Although the Khateek (butchers) are generally viewed as a higher caste than Bhangis, the latter refuse to offer cleaning services to Khateeks, believing that their profession renders them unclean. They also consider the Balai, Dholi and Mogya as unclean and do not associate with them.

Notable people

See also

Similarly discriminated groups

References

Sources

Further reading

External links 

 International Dalit Solidarity Network
 Is there ‘Dalit’ literature in Bangla?

 
Caste system in India
Caste system in Nepal